Geordine Henry (born 21 March 1988) is a Jamaican female badminton player.

Achievements

BWF International Challenge/Series
Women's Doubles

Mixed Doubles

 BWF International Challenge tournament
 BWF International Series tournament
 BWF Future Series tournament

References

External links
 

1988 births
Living people
Jamaican female badminton players
Commonwealth Games competitors for Jamaica
Badminton players at the 2014 Commonwealth Games
Competitors at the 2014 Central American and Caribbean Games